Melbourne Inman (15 July 1878 – 11 August 1951) was the World Billiards Champion in 1908, 1909, 1912, 1913, 1914 and 1919.

Biography
He was born on 15 July 1878 in Twickenham, Middlesex, England, to Robert Withy Inman (1844–1919) and Annie Cross (1852–1938). On 19 May 1905 he married Florence Ambler (1885–1971) and they had a son, Melbourne Sydney Inman (1909–1947) although his first names were transposed when his death was recorded in Chelsea, London, as Sydney Melbourne Inman.

He was the Billiards World Champion in 1908–1909, 1912–1914 and 1919. In 1914 he defeated Willie Hoppe. Inman also participated in the 1927 World Snooker Championship reaching the second round. He died at the age of 73 years on 11 August 1951 in Farnborough.

References

1878 births
1951 deaths
World champions in English billiards
English snooker players
Three-cushion billiards players
People from Twickenham